Cyperus pulicaris is a species of sedge that is endemic to Haiti.

The species was first formally described by the botanist Georg Kükenthal in 1926.

See also
 List of Cyperus species

References

pulicaris
Taxa named by Georg Kükenthal
Plants described in 1926
Flora of Haiti
Flora without expected TNC conservation status